ASA-CHANG & Junray is a band founded by Japanese percussionist ASA-CHANG, who was the founder and original bandmaster of Tokyo Ska Paradise Orchestra. After leaving the group in 1993, he formed ASA-CHANG & Junray in 1998 with programmer and guitarist Hidehiko Urayama. They were joined in 2000 by tabla player U-zhaan. Live, the group used a portable sound-system called 'Jun-Ray Tronics', hence the name; the word 'junray', however, also means 'pilgrimage'.

In 2002, the British label The Leaf Label released Jun Ray Song Chang, which compiled the group's first two Japan-only albums. It was followed a year later by the mini album Tsu Gi Ne Pu. The group's song 'Hana' was featured on Fabric Live 07, while 'Tsuginepu To Ittemita' was included on a The Wire Tapper CD. The group's 2005 album, Minna no Junray, featured vocals by singer and actress Kyōko Koizumi.

On March 31, 2010, Urayama and U-zhaan left the band.

In 2012, saxophone flute player Yoshihiro Goseki and violinist Anzu Suhara joined as live members.

In 2013, their song "Hana" was re-done and used as the ending theme for the anime adaptation of Shuzo Oshimi's The Flowers of Evil. Several versions, including the original, are used throughout the series.

Members
 ASA-CHANG (Hirokazu Asakura, ex. Tokyo Ska Paradise Orchestra): percussion, tablabongo
 Yoshihiro Goseki (ex. DCPRG, ex. Zainichi Funk): sax,  flute, vocal
 Anzu Suhara (ex. Led Act Sect): violin, guitar, vocal

Former members
 Hidehiko Urayama: guitar, music sequencer
 U-zhaan: tabla

Albums
Tabla Magma Bongo, 1998 (Japan only)
Hana, 2001  (Japan only)
Jun Ray Song Chang, The Leaf Label 2002
Tsu Gi Ne Pu, The Leaf Label 2003 (BBC review)
Minna no Junray, 2005
Kage No Nai  Hito, 2009
Mahou, 2016
事件, 2020

External links

 
 
Asa Chang on The Leaf Label

Experimental musical groups
Japanese experimental musicians